Duke Ludwig Friedrich Alexander of Württemberg (30 August 1756, in Treptow an der Rega20 September 1817, in Kirchheim unter Teck) was the second son of Frederick II Eugene, Duke of Württemberg (1732–1797) and Margravine Sophia Dorothea of Brandenburg-Schwedt (1736–1798). His elder brother was Frederick I, the first King of Württemberg, and his sister was the Russian Empress consort, Maria Feodorovna. Louis retained the pre-royal title of Duke.

Biography 
Louis Frederick was a general in the cavalry. He was briefly a high ranking commander the Army of the Polish-Lithuanian Commonwealth appointed the commander of the Grand Duchy of Lithuania's army, but betrayed the Commonwealth, refusing to fight against Russian troops throughout the Polish–Russian War of 1792, while feigning illness. For his betrayal he was dismissed from his post, but never prosecuted. His Polish wife, Duchess Maria, divorced him shortly afterward after his treason became public knowledge.

Between 1807 and 1810, Duke Louis employed the composer Carl Maria von Weber as his secretary with no musical duties.  Weber and the duke's older brother Frederick mutually disliked each other, and the composer was banished from Württemberg after accusations of misappropriating some of the duke's money.

He is an ancestor of Queen Elizabeth II of the United Kingdom and her husband Prince Philip, King Felipe VI of Spain and Charles Napoléon.

Marriages and issue 
He married on 28 October 1784 Princess Maria Czartoryska (1768–1854), daughter of Prince Adam Kazimierz Czartoryski and Countess Isabella von Flemming.

They had one child before they divorced in 1793 (Maria initiated the divorce upon the news of his betrayal of Poland):
 Adam Karl Wilhelm Stanislaus Eugen Paul Ludwig (16 January 179227 July 1847)

The couple had five children:
 Maria Dorothea Luise Wilhelmine Karoline (1 November 179730 March 1855); married in 1819 Archduke Joseph of Austria (9 March 177613 January 1847).
 Amalie Therese Luise Wilhelmine Philippine (28 June 179928 November 1848) married in 1817 Joseph, Duke of Saxe-Altenburg (27 August 178925 November 1868).
 Pauline Therese Luise (4 September 180010 March 1873); married in 1820 her first cousin, William I of Württemberg.
 Elisabeth Alexandrine Konstanze (27 February 18025 December 1864); married in 1830 Prince William of Baden (8 April 179211 October 1859).
 Alexander Paul Ludwig Konstantin (9 September 18044 July 1885); married, morganitically, on 2 May 1835, Countess Claudine Rhédey von Kis-Rhéde, and had issue (21 September 18121 October 1841); founded the second branch of the House of Württemberg, known as the Dukes of Teck.

Ancestry

References 

1756 births
1817 deaths
People from Trzebiatów
Generals of the Polish–Lithuanian Commonwealth
Lieutenant generals of Prussia
Louis Frederick Alexander
People of the Polish–Russian War of 1792
People from the Province of Pomerania
Imperial Russian Army generals
German Lutherans
Sons of monarchs